Suhasini is an Indian actress, who has predominantly appeared in Telugu films. She began her acting career in 2003 in the Telugu film industry with a starring role. She went on to play lead and supporting roles in Telugu films and appear in a number of Tamil and Bhojpuri films, before debuting in television.

Career
Suhasini hails from Nellore district in Andhra Pradesh, India. Her acting debut was B. Jaya's Chantigadu after which she went on to act in four Tamil films. In her first Tamil film, the horror flick Adhu, she played a ghost, and The Hindu's critic noted that she was "quite expressive". She later acted in Rama Narayanan's Mannin Maindhan, a remake of the Telugu film Yagnam. About Suha's performance in the film, The Hindu wrote: "Suha is beautiful and charming in the song sequences and has also tried her best to emote". She was also cast as the female lead in Unnai Enakku Pidichirukku, that featured comedian Senthil's son Naveen in his debut. All her Tamil projects were unsuccessful.

She then returned to Telugu cinema and in the following years, she either starred in low-profile films—such as Sundaraniki Tondarekkuva, which saw her reuniting with her Chantigadu co-star Baladitya, Guna, Prema Charitra, Highway and Sandadi—or appeared in supporting roles in projects like Kokila, Bhookailas, Lakshmi Kalyanam, Pandurangadu  and Punnami Naagu. In between, she had another Tamil release Gnabagam Varuthe, co-starring Venkat Prabhu and S. P. B. Charan, and also made her Kannada debut in Baa Bega Chandamama.

In 2010, she ventured into television, playing the lead role in the Telugu serial Aparanji. The series completed over 300 episodes, which led to her landing further lead roles in Anubandalu (replacing Meena) and Ashta Chamma, besides earning her the 2011 AP Cinegoers' Award for Best Actress. She also acted in a Tamil TV series, Sivasankari. After her television debut, she enacted lead roles in Super Good Films' Tamil drama film Pillaiyar Theru Kadaisi Veedu  and the Telugu devotional film Sri Vasavi Vaibhavam, and acted in two Bhojpuri films with Sudip Pandey.

In February 2015, her new TV Serial Iddaru-Ammayilu started on Zee Telugu.

Filmography

Television

References

External links
 

Living people
Telugu actresses
Actresses in Telugu cinema
Indian film actresses
Actresses in Tamil cinema
People from Nellore district
Actresses from Andhra Pradesh
Actresses in Telugu television
21st-century Indian actresses
Indian television actresses
Actresses in Bhojpuri cinema
Actresses in Tamil television
1988 births